Tropic of Capricorn is a compilation album of orchestral music. Subtitled Orchestral Music by Queensland Composers, the album has 5 tracks each composed by a different composer who had either worked or studied in Queensland. The album was nominated for 1989 ARIA Award for Best Classical Album.

Track listing

 Bacchanals (Wilfred Lehmann)
 Garotte (Andrew Schultz)
 Nadja (Gerard Brophy)
 Bamaga diptych (Richard Mills)
 Oboe concertino (Colin Brumby)

Personnel
Orchestras
Queensland Symphony Orchestra (tracks 1,2,4,5)
Sydney Symphony Orchestra (3)
Queensland Theatre Orchestra (4)

Conductors
Wilfred Lehmann (1,5)
Robert Boughen (2)
Myer Fredman (3)
Richard Mills (4)

Additional
Barry Davis - oboe (5)

References

Compilation albums by Australian artists